Archbishop Elder may refer to:
William Henry Elder, Archbishop of Cincinnati
Elder High School, named for the archbishop